Mister Magic is the fourth album by jazz saxophonist Grover Washington Jr., released in February 1975. The album topped both the soul and jazz albums chart and peaked at number ten on the pop chart.

Critical reception 

Reviewing for The Village Voice in 1975, Robert Christgau found the album "functional" and satisfactory for a commercially successful jazz album: "Washington plays a warm tenor in the pop jazz tradition of Gene Ammons, but the rhythm section percolates danceably, and the result is sexy background music only superficially marred by Bob James's strings."

In a retrospective review for Allmusic, Scott Yanow gave the album five out of five stars and said that it is "one of Grover Washington Jr.'s best-loved recordings and considered a classic of r&bish jazz." He found Washington to be in "particularly creative form" and called James' arrangements "colorful if somewhat commercial".

Track listing

Personnel 
 Grover Washington Jr. – alto saxophone, soprano saxophone, tenor saxophone 
 Bob James – acoustic piano, Fender Rhodes, arrangements and conductor 
 Eric Gale – guitars
 Phil Upchurch – bass (1)
 Gary King – bass (2, 3, 4)
 Harvey Mason – drums
 Ralph MacDonald – percussion

Brass and Reed Section
 Phil Bodner – baritone saxophone
 Jerry Dodgion – tenor saxophone
 Tony Studd – bass trombone
 Wayne Andre – trombone
 Jon Faddis and Marvin Stamm – trumpet, flugelhorn

String Section
 Charles McCracken and Alan Shulman – cello
 Alfred Brown and Emanuel Vardi – viola
 Max Ellen, Paul Gershman, Harry Glickman, Harold Kohon, Harry Lookofsky, Joe Malin, David Nadien and Matthew Raimondi  – violin

Production 
 Creed Taylor – producer 
 Rudy Van Gelder – engineer
 Bob Ciano – album design 
 Alen MacWeeney – photography 
 Doug Ramsey – liner notes

Charts

Singles

References

External links
 

1975 albums
Grover Washington Jr. albums
Kudu Records albums
Albums produced by Creed Taylor
Albums recorded at Van Gelder Studio
Smooth jazz albums